"Brizgalna Brizga" was Atomik Harmonik's first hit. The song brought the band the Melodije morja in sonca televote award. It continued on to become the biggest summer hit in Slovenia in 2004.

Track listing
Brizgalna Brizga (3:59)
Brizgalna Brizga (remix by DJ Umek) (3:52) 
Brizgalna Brizga (karaoke) (3:58) 
Brizgalna Brizga (video)

References

2004 singles
Atomik Harmonik songs
2004 songs